The College of Medicine in King Saud University was established as the first medical college in the Kingdom in 1967. One year later, King Abdul-Aziz University Hospital, became affiliated with the college and subsequently in 1981, King Khalid University Hospital and the new college building were established to become the main teaching campus and patient service facility. To date, the college has graduated more than 4000 undergraduate students, 200 postgraduates students, and more than 700 graduates from different medical specialties fellowship programs.

History 
The Kingdom of Saudi Arabia witnesses exceptional progress in many fields such as health and science. King Saud University's College of Medicine was established in 1967 during the reign of King Faisal. Actual studies began in 1969. The choice of members for the Teaching Board and the supervision of exams until 1978 were done cooperatively between the faculty and the University of London. In 1974/1975, the College opened a special department for female students and incorporated the Ministry of Health's Prince ts name was changed to King Abdulaziz University Hospital to be utilized for training male and female students in the clinical stage. At the 25th anniversary of inauguration of King Saud University 1981, the building of College of Medicine and King Khalid University Hospital were inaugurated for teaching and health services. The college has also made agreements with different universities in America, Canada and U.K. to support this Academic Board in the college and to train graduate Saudi doctors, as well as to provide preparation for their higher studies and specialization in different medical disciplines.

Ranking 
To further testify for the leadership of this college and quality of its programs, it has been ranked 97th in the world in the Times QS ranking of world universities in the field of Medical and Biological Sciences in the year 2009.

Research 
The college has a very well known reputation in the field of scientific medical research. Among their staff there a number of internationally known and heavily cited scientists.  According to “Scopus” the college is the top among all institutions in the Kingdom in terms of scientific medical publications and it has been awarded the Scopus award last year for the most cited research in Saudi Arabia over the last 10 years.
According to COSMSTECH (the organization of Islamic Conferences standing committee on scientific and technological corporation) which tracks all ISI publications in all Islamic countries the College of Medicine at KSU and affiliated hospitals contributed to about 35% of all scientific contributions from the country ranked the highest. Over the last 10 years.
They have had recent interest in scientific research at all levels in the country starting from the government to the University administration and finally from the Deanship of Medical College.

Hospitals

King Abdulaziz University Hospital 
The first university Hospital was King Abdulaziz University Hospital which was founded in 1956 but only got affiliated to the college in 1976.
This facility now specializes in ENT and ophthalmology. These two departments are among the largest in the Middle East in these specialties. They host skilled physicians in all subspecialties of ENT and ophthalmology as well as world class researchers. In addition, it contains some general medical and pediatric services as well as the university diabetes center. All care is free of charge for all King Saud University staff and students. The hospital provides primary and secondary care services for Saudi patients from Northern Riyadh area. It also provides tertiary care services to all Saudi citizens on referral basis.

King Khalid University Hospital 
In 1982, a dedicated university hospital was opened and was named King Khalid University Hospital. This facility is an 850-bed facility with all general and subspecialty medical services. It contains a special outpatient building, more than 20 operating rooms, and a fully equipped and staffed laboratory, radiology, and pharmacy services in addition to all other supporting services.
The hospital provides primary and secondary care services for Saudi patients from Northern Riyadh area. It also provides tertiary care services to all Saudi citizens on referral bases. All care is free of charge for all King Saud University staff and students.

Undergraduate 
The college offers Bachelor of Medicine, Bachelor of Surgery degree(M.B.B.S.).After high-school students can join King Saud university  preparatory year college, after passing first year with the required GPA, they can join the medical school.

Postgraduate 
The college offers 43 accredited postgraduate training programs (4 programs in process). The duration of training varies from 1 to 5 years. There are currently approximately 315 trainees, including residents, fellows, and international trainees.

Departments 
 The college of Medicine and university hospitals are proud to have highly qualified faculty in all disciplines of Medicine. All basic sciences are represented as well as all clinical disciplines. Most departments also have divisions representing different specialties. Most departments supervise both academic and clinical functions of the discipline as well as all related research activities. In addition, a fully staffed Medical Education department supports all teaching and learning issues as well as supervise the skills lab.

Medical Education
Anatomy
Anesthesia
Cardiac Sciences
Dermatology
Emergency Medicine
ENT
Family & Community Medicine
Medicine
OBS-Gynecology
Ophthalmology
Orthopedics
Pathology
Pediatrics
Pharmacology
Psychiatry
Physiology
Radiology
Surgery
Critical Care

Notable alumni 
Notable alumni
Abdullah bin Abdulaziz Al Rabiah - Minister of Health.
Yazeed Abdul Rahman al-Ohali - Director of the Hospitals at the Ministry of Health.
Tawfik Ahmed Khoja - GM of health centers at the ministry of health.
Mohammed Hassan Mufti - Hospital Director of public security forces hospital.
Sultan Abdullah Bahebri - Executive Director of King Faisal Specialist Hospital and Research Centre, Jeddah.
Muhammad Hamza Khchim - Director of King Khaled Hospital.

See also

 List of things named after Saudi Kings

References

External links
College of Medicine, KSU
King Saud University
King Saud University Digital Library
More information

Hospital buildings completed in 1967
King Saud University
Hospitals in Saudi Arabia
Medical education in Saudi Arabia
Teaching hospitals
Educational institutions established in 1967
1967 establishments in Saudi Arabia